Quinchao Island is an island in Chiloé Province, Chile, off the east coast of Chiloé Island.  It includes the communes of Quinchao and Curaco de Vélez. Main towns are Achao and Curaco de Vélez. Quinchao Island is separated from Chiloé Island by Dalcahue Channel in the northwest of the island.  

Islands of Chiloé Archipelago